Risør is a Seaside resort, a town and the administrative centre of Risør municipality in Agder county, Norway. The town is located along the Skaggerak coast on a peninsula between the entrances to the Søndeledfjorden (to the north) and the Sandnesfjorden (to the south). The town is one of the oldest towns in Southern Norway. It was declared a ladested in 1630 and upgraded to a kjøpstad in 1723.

Risør is known as "the white town by the Skaggerak" because of its numerous well-preserved, old, white, wooden houses which the town actively protects. It is famous for its tourist attractions such as the wooden boat festival which is staged during the first week of August every year. It also has a growing reputation as the regional capital of arts and crafts, which culminates in the "Villvin-festival" during the summer holiday season. There are two historic churches in Risør: Risør Church near the town centre and Frydendal Church in the western part of the town. The Stangholmen Lighthouse lies a short distance off the shore, just southeast of the harbor, marking the channel leading into the town.

History
The village of Risør was a small fishing village in the prestegjeld of Søndeled when Dutch vessels began to call there to purchase timber around the year 1570. By 1607, two inns had been opened to serve Dutch sailors. In 1630, Risør became a privileged port (ladested).  The town's timber-framed church, Risør Church, was built in the Baroque style in 1647.  

In 1723, Risør was granted kjøpstad status which granted it a number of commercial privileges. By the end of the 18th century, 96 sailing vessels were owned by Risør merchants. It was the sixth largest shipping town and one of four shipbuilding centers in Norway.

In Letters on Sweden, Norway, and Denmark, Mary Wollstonecraft wrote extensively while visiting Risør in 1783, including the following remarks:
 On entering Risør: "We were a considerable time entering amongst the islands, before we saw about two hundred houses crowded together under a very high rock—still higher appearing above."
 While at Risør: "...seaports are not favorable to improvement. The captains acquire a little superficial knowledge by traveling, which their indefatigable attention to the making of money prevents their digesting; and the fortune that they thus laboriously acquire is spent, as it usually is in towns of this description, in show and good living."
 While departing Risør: "The view of the town was now extremely fine. A huge rocky mountain stood up behind it, and a vast cliff stretched on each side, forming a semicircle. In a recess of the rocks was a clump of pines, amongst which a steeple rose picturesquely beautiful."

Risør played a role in the Napoleonic Wars from 1807 to 1814, when Denmark–Norway took France's side, and therefore became the enemy of Norway's most important trading-partner: Great Britain. (It is from this period that Henrik Ibsen took his subject, when he created his famous poem Terje Vigen.)

On 1 January 1838, the new formannskapsdistrikt law came into effect, granting each parish and town in Norway the rights to have a self-governing council. Thus, Risør was a small town with its own town council to run it.

Risør was almost wiped off the map in 1861. A great fire swept across the small town leaving just 85 houses and the 1647 Risør Church. The entire road network was re-worked after the fire to remove the small streets and alleys and have wider roads that are there today. The town was redesigned and rebuilt and today it presents a positive impression of a well kept town with white, wooden houses. White was chosen because it was an expensive paint and they residents wanted to give an expression of prosperity. Still today, most houses have white paint, although some have other colors on the sides and back of their houses.

By the second half of the 19th century, over 100 sailing vessels were based at their home port in Risør and more than 1,000 sailors called Risør home. The transition to steamships and the economic damage of World War I, however, destroyed Risør's shipping industry.

On 1 January 1901, an area of the neighboring municipality of Søndeled (population: 658) was transferred to the city, greatly expanding Risør. During the 1960s, there were many municipal mergers across Norway due to the work of the Schei Committee. On 1 January 1964, the town of Risør (population: 3,002) and the entire municipality of Søndeled (population: 3,134) were merged to form a new, much larger municipality of Risør, with the town being the administrative centre.

Name
The name for the town of Risør likely comes from the Old Norse name . The name was originally referring to the nearby island of Risøya which is located just outside the town. The old name of the town (until 1909) was Østerrisør (meaning "eastern Risør"). The first element was added in the 16th century to distinguish the town from Vesterrisør, the old name of Mandal.

Media gallery

Notable residents

 Erik Mykland, a professional footballer
 Victor D. Norman, the former minister of labor and administration and a professor of economy at NHH
 Serene Torjussen Evensen (also known as Serena Gardner), the first female convert in Norway to the Church of Jesus Christ of Latter-Day Saints
 Ove Ansteinsson (1884–1942), a journalist and author
 Isak Lauritssøn Falck (1601–1669), a land owner and timber merchant
 Thorbjørn Jagland, politician, former prime minister of Norway

See also
List of towns and cities in Norway

References

Populated places in Agder
Cities and towns in Norway
Port cities and towns of the North Sea
Port cities and towns in Norway
Seaside resorts in Norway
Risør
1630 establishments in Norway